Scouting was introduced in Bhutan in 1970. In July 1999, the Bhutan Scout Tshogpa, (Dzongkha: འབྲུག་ཨིསི་ཀའུཊ་ཚོགས་པ་) the coeducational Bhutan Scouts Association, was welcomed as a member of the World Organization of the Scout Movement at the 35th World Scout Conference in Durban, South Africa. Membership stood at 18,170 as of 2011.

Since 1995, Unit Leader Training courses were organized by the World Scout Bureau-Asia-Pacific Region with the assistance of the Bharat Scouts and Guides, Bangladesh Scouts, Pakistan Boy Scouts Association, the Scout Association of Japan, and the Canadian Scout Brotherhood Fund. 

Scouts from Bhutan participated in the 1998 World Jamboree in Chile, in the 20th World Scout Jamboree in Thailand and in the 21st World Scout Jamboree in the United Kingdom. 

The remote kingdom hosted the Asia-Pacific Regional First South Asia Foundation-Scout Friendship Camp from February 21 to 26, 2002, in which hundreds of Scouts and Leaders in the districts of Thimphu, Punakha and Wangdue participated. "Regional Cooperation" was the theme of the camp, in which 550 girls and boys from all South Asian countries participated. 

The first National Jamboree was held from January 31 to February 6, 2007. 

In November 2008 the Scouts helped to prepare the Coronation Celebrations, cleaning the streets of the capital. 

The membership badge of Bhutan Scout Tshogpa incorporates the color scheme of the flag of Bhutan, and the fleur-de-lis is wrapped in a khata, the traditional ceremonial scarf. The Scout Motto in Dzongkha is གྲ་འགྲིག་འབད་ གྲ་འགྲིག་འབད་,Dra drig Bay.

See also
World Buddhist Scout Brotherhood

References

http://scouts.elysiumgates.com/bhutan.html

World Organization of the Scout Movement member organizations
Scouting in Bhutan
Youth organizations established in 1970